Srodino is a rural locality (a village) in Vozhbalskoye Rural Settlement, Totemsky  District, Vologda Oblast, Russia. The population was 30 as of 2002.

Geography 
Srodino is located 47 km northwest of Totma (the district's administrative centre) by road. Panovo is the nearest rural locality.

References 

Rural localities in Tarnogsky District